Sapul sa Singko (English: Bullseye on Five), formerly Sapul (English: Bullseye)  was TV5’s daily morning show. The two-hour program premiered on April 5, 2010, as Sapul and due to its widespread success and viewership, it was expanded to a three-hour program on October 25, 2010, and rebranded as Sapul sa Singko. On February 6, 2012, the show was succeeded by Good Morning Club, which focused more on the homemaker and professional female viewers.

History
Sapul was first aired on TV5 on April 5, 2010, as the network's answer to NBC's, NBC News Today, ABS-CBN's Umagang Kay Ganda and GMA's Unang Hirit. Erwin Tulfo, Martin Andanar, Lourd de Veyra, and Shawn Yao started the show as the original hosts.

On October 25, 2010, Sapul was rebranded and retitled as Sapul sa Singko with fresh and hip OBB and graphics and the addition of two new cast members- Chiqui Roa-Puno (who later became a Congresswoman) and Atty. Mike Templo, the weekend news anchor at that time. The new OBB marked the return of the official theme song of TEN: The Evening News, entitled "Astro" by Radioactive Sago Project, and the program running time of two hours was extended to three hours, beginning at 5am and ended at 8am every weekday.

On November 8, 2010, the main news portion of the show began its simulcast on radio thru Radyo5 92.3 News FM in Mega Manila for thirty minutes from 5:30 to 6 am.

On February 21, 2011, Sapul sa Singko started its simulcast on AksyonTV.

On September 5, 2011, Sapul sa Singko cut the time from 3 hours to 2 hours to give way to its spin-off show Kumare Klub which also hosted by Amy Perez, Chiqui Roa-Puno, and Tintin Babao.

In September 2011, Paolo Bediones joined the cast as a replacement for Erwin Tulfo.

On February 3, 2012, Sapul sa Singko aired its final episode due to eventual reprogramming and to give way for Good Morning Club.

Hosts

Main hosts
 Martin Andanar
 Chiqui Roa-Puno
 Lourd de Veyra
 Shawn Yao
 Atty. Mike Templo
 Paolo Bediones
 Amy Perez
 Lia Cruz
 Tintin Babao

Segment hosts
 Ferdinand "Makata Tawanan" Clemente
 Benjie "Tsongkibenj" Felipe
 Chinkee Tan
 Pat Fernandez
 Ariel Villasanta

Former hosts
 Erwin Tulfo
 Cherie Mercado

Segments

Sapul sa Singko
Word Of The Lourd (Lourd de Veyra; appears once a week)
Makata on the Spot (Makata Tawanan)
Rapido Meals - Recipe of the day (Lourd de Veyra) formerly known as Lutong Sapul
Love Hurts - Short drama presentation & Love advice (Martin Andanar, Lourd de Veyra, Shawn Yao, Paolo Bediones and Amy Perez)
Tibok ng Bayan - Love Hurts on the Street (Ariel Villasanta)
Gwaping in the Morning - Real Man's Lifestyle (Martin Andanar, Paolo Bediones, Lourd de Veyra and Atty. Mike Templo)
Active Mornings (Lia Cruz)
Poging Balita - Good News (Atty. Mike Templo)
Balitang Sapul - News (Broadcast at 5:15, 6:00 and 7:30) - Anchored by Martin Andanar, Chiqui-Roa Puno, Paolo Bediones and Amy Perez
Tinamaan ng Sapul - Police Reports
Balitang Iba Pa - Feature News  (Lourd de Veyra)
Probinsyang Sapul - Provincial and Regional News
Sports Sapul - Sports News (Lia Cruz)
Sapul Around the World - Foreign News (Atty. Mike Templo and Shawn Yao)
Showbiz Chis-Mwah - Showbiz News (Patricia Fernandez)
Traffic Sapul - Traffic Update (Ariel Villasanta)
Alagang Kapatid -  A Siblings Touch
Talo-Panalo - Discussion on the hottest issues of the day
Usapang Sapul - Interview (Paolo Bediones and the guests personalities)
Aksyon Weather - Weather Forecast

Kumare Klub
Angel Rowda On The Go (Rowda Magnaye)
Chiqui Chiqui Dance (Amy Perez, Tintin Babao and Chiqui Roa-Puno)
Fashionistang Mudra (Tintin Babao and Renee Salud)
Kumare Chika (Amy Perez, Tintin Babao and Chiqui Roa-Puno)
Kumare Tips (Amy Perez, Tintin Babao and Chiqui Roa-Puno)
Luto Na Ba T'yang? (Amy Perez)
OK Ka Lang? (Chiqui Roa-Puno)
Pera Pera Lang (Chinkee Tan)
ParenTin (Tintin Babao)

See also
List of programs aired by TV5 (Philippine TV network)
List of programs aired by AksyonTV/5 Plus

External links

 

TV5 (Philippine TV network) original programming
News5 shows
2010 Philippine television series debuts
2012 Philippine television series endings
Filipino-language television shows